Peter Donalek from the MWH Global, Chicago, IL was named Fellow of the Institute of Electrical and Electronics Engineers (IEEE) in 2014 for contributions to grid-connected pumped storage hydro systems.

References

External links
IEEE Explore Bio

Fellow Members of the IEEE
Living people
Year of birth missing (living people)
Place of birth missing (living people)
American electrical engineers